Azaad TV is an Indian Hindi language general entertainment channel that  broadcast old and Some original shows like Kasturi and  Chhotki Chatanki. Its shows can be watched live on MX Player. Azaad is also availablele on DD Free Dish Azaad TV was shut down on 10 August 2022 in India.

Former shows

Original shows

Acquired shows

References

External links 
 Official Website

Hindi-language television channels in India
Television channels and stations established in 2021
Hindi-language television stations
2021 establishments in Uttar Pradesh